Alan Pauls (born 22 April 1959 in Buenos Aires) is an Argentine writer, literary critic and screenwriter. An early essay he did on Betrayed by Rita Hayworth by Manuel Puig is said to show his interest in him as an "experimental writer." Although Pauls has expressed skepticism about the avant-garde as any form of program, preferring to see it as a "toolbox." Among his own experimental works is Wasabi from 1994. He also had a longstanding interest in film and his later work El pasado was adapted to film in 2007. He wrote a "History of" trilogy with the titles being History of crying, History of hair, and History of money. He has additionally served as a visiting professor at Princeton University.

Selected works

Books

Essays

Filmography

Honors and fellowships

External links 
 
 Biography

References 

1959 births
Living people
Argentine male writers
Writers from Buenos Aires
Prix Roger Caillois recipients